Bayou Bartholomew is the longest bayou in the world, meandering approximately  between the U.S. states of Arkansas and Louisiana. It contains over 100 aquatic species making it the second most diverse stream in North America. Known for its excellent bream, catfish, and crappie fishing, portions of the bayou are considered some of the best kept secrets of Arkansas anglers. It starts northwest of the city of Pine Bluff, Arkansas, in the Hardin community, winds through parts of Jefferson, Lincoln, Desha, Drew, Chicot, and Ashley counties in Arkansas, and Morehouse Parish, Louisiana, and eventually enters the Ouachita River after passing the northernmost tip of Ouachita Parish, near Sterlington, Louisiana. The bayou serves as the primary border separating the Arkansas Delta from the Arkansas Timberlands.

The present bayou bed was formed by the waters of the Arkansas River during a period when it was constantly changing courses. Approximately 1,800 to 2,200 years ago, the river diverted from the present area of the bayou, and the leisurely bayou began to develop in the old river bed. Prior to construction of railroad lines in the area in the late 19th century, it was the most important stream for transportation in the interior Delta. It allowed the development of one of the richest timber and agricultural industries in the Delta area.

Once a pristine stream, it is now polluted, log-jammed, and over-sedimented in certain sections. In 1995, Curtis Merrell of Monticello in Drew County organized the Bayou Bartholomew Alliance to "restore and preserve the natural beauty" of the bayou. With help from the Alliance, many government organizations (such as the Arkansas Game and Fish Commission, Arkansas Soil and Water Conservation Commission, Arkansas Department of Environmental Quality, USDA Natural Resources Conservation Service, Environmental Protection Agency, U.S. Fish and Wildlife Service), Ducks Unlimited, and the public, the bayou may eventually reclaim some of its grandeur. Projects underway include monitoring water quality, planting trees for buffer zones, restoring riparian sites ruined by clear-cutting, trash removal, removing log jams, bank stabilization, building boat ramps, and encouraging no-till farming. 

At Beekman, Louisiana, the bayou has a mean annual discharge of 1,985 cubic feet per second.

Location
Mouth Confluence with the Ouachita River in Morehouse Parish, Louisiana: 
Source Jefferson County, Arkansas:

See also
List of Louisiana Natural and Scenic Rivers

References

External links

Ouachita River
Rivers of Ashley County, Arkansas
Rivers of Chicot County, Arkansas
Rivers of Desha County, Arkansas
Rivers of Drew County, Arkansas
Rivers of Jefferson County, Arkansas
Rivers of Lincoln County, Arkansas
Rivers of Morehouse Parish, Louisiana
Rivers of Ouachita Parish, Louisiana
Tributaries of the Red River of the South
Wetlands and bayous of Louisiana
Wetlands of Arkansas